Esteban Nicolás González (born 16 September 1978 in Córdoba, Argentina) is a former Argentine footballer and current coach.

References

External links
 Argentine Primera statistics

1978 births
Living people
Footballers from Córdoba, Argentina
Argentine footballers
Association football midfielders
Club Atlético Belgrano footballers
Club de Gimnasia y Esgrima La Plata footballers
S.S. Lazio players
Club Atlético Colón footballers
UD Las Palmas players
Club Atlético Tigre footballers
Argentine expatriate footballers
Expatriate footballers in Italy
Expatriate footballers in Spain
Serie A players
Argentine Primera División players
Argentine expatriate sportspeople in Italy
Argentine expatriate sportspeople in Spain
Club Atlético Belgrano managers
Argentine football managers